Maraschino Cherry is an American hardcore pornographic film and comedy released in 1978. The film was directed by Radley Metzger (as "Henry Paris") and filmed in several locations in New York City; it was his fifth and final hardcore film.

Plot
Maraschino Cherry (Gloria Leonard), the owner of a high-class escort service in New York City, teaches her younger sister Penny Cherry (Jenny Baxter) about the business The two sisters reflect on a series of erotic episodes related to the service and its clients., replete with humorous puns and innuendos.

Cast

 Gloria Leonard as Maraschino "Mara" Cherry
 Jenny Baxter as Penny Cherry, Maraschino Cherry's younger sister
 Lesllie Bovee as Maraschino's personal assistant
 Annette Haven as the Piano Bar Girl
 C. J. Laing as a Slave
 Constance Money as an Escort
 Eric Edwards as a Client
 Michael Gaunt as a Client
 Susan McBain as an Escort
 Wade Nichols as a Boyfriend

Reception
One film reviewer notes that "[Maraschino Cherry] may not be [Metzger's] finest moment", but that it is "... still a beautifully shot film ... the dialogue is well written, the humor genuinely funny ...". Another reviewer writes, "Most of Metzger’s films are known for their offbeat humor and witty dialog. Maraschino Cherry is filled [with] many amusing comedy set pieces ...".

Background
Maraschino Cherry was released  during the Golden Age of Porn (inaugurated by the 1969 release of Andy Warhol Blue Movie) in the United States, at a time of "porno chic", in which adult erotic films were just beginning to be widely released, publicly discussed by celebrities (like Johnny Carson and Bob Hope) and taken seriously by film critics (like Roger Ebert).

Notes
According to one film reviewer, Radley Metzger's films, including those made during the Golden Age of Porn (1969–1984), are noted for their "lavish design, witty screenplays, and a penchant for the unusual camera angle". Another reviewer noted that his films were "highly artistic — and often cerebral ... and often featured gorgeous cinematography". Film and audio works by Metzger have been added to the permanent collection of the Museum of Modern Art (MoMA) in New York City.

Remastered version
In 2009, DistribPix released a complete remastering of the film, with the full cooperation of the director. The result had a limited exhibition in theaters, but the main outcome of the project was the first-ever official remastered DVD version. A listing of the music on the film soundtrack was released earlier.

Music soundtrack

See also

 Andy Warhol filmography
 Erotic art
 Erotic films in the United States
 Erotic photography
 Golden Age of Porn
 List of American films of 1978
 Sex in film
 Unsimulated sex

References

Further reading
 
 Heffernan, Kevin, "A social poetics of pornography", Quarterly Review of Film and Video, Volume 15, Issue 3, December 1994, pp. 77–83. .
 Lehman, Peter, Pornography: film and culture, Rutgers depth of field series, Rutgers University Press, 2006, .
 Williams, Linda, Hard core: power, pleasure, and the "frenzy of the visible", University of California Press, 1999, .

External links
 Marascino Cherry at  MUBI (related to The Criterion Collection)
 
 
 Maraschino Cherry – 2009 remastering at DistribPix

American erotic films
Films directed by Radley Metzger
1978 films
1970s pornographic films
Films set in New York City
1970s English-language films
1970s American films